Pierzchno may refer to the following places:
Pierzchno, Poznań County in Greater Poland Voivodeship (west-central Poland)
Pierzchno, Środa Wielkopolska County in Greater Poland Voivodeship (west-central Poland)
Pierzchno, Silesian Voivodeship (south Poland)